Municipal elections took place  in Milan, Italy, on 3 and 4 October 2021 to elect the Mayor and the 48 members of the City Council, as well as the nine presidents and 270 councillors of the nine administrative zones (municipi) in which the municipality is divided, each one having one president and 30 councillors.

Local elections in Italy are usually scheduled between 15 April and 15 June, however on 4 March 2021 the Italian government decided to postpone them to the autumn following a new spike of cases in the coronavirus pandemic.

As a result, incumbent mayor Giuseppe Sala was re-elected for a second five-year term by a landslide.

Electoral system
The semipresidential voting system is used for all mayoral elections in Italy, in the cities with a population higher than 15,000 inhabitants, for the seventh time. Under this system, voters express a direct choice for the mayor or an indirect choice voting for the party of the candidate's coalition. If no candidate receives 50% of votes during the first round, the top two candidates go to a second round after two weeks. The winning candidate obtains a majority bonus equal to 60% of seats.

The election of the City Council is based on a direct choice for the candidate with a maximum of two preferential votes, each for a different gender, belonging to the same party list: the candidate with the majority of the preferences is elected. The number of the seats for each losing party is determined proportionally, using D'Hondt seat allocation. Only coalitions with more than 3% of votes are eligible to get any seats.

Background

Centre-left coalition
On 7 December 2020, the incumbent mayor Giuseppe Sala announced that he had chosen to run for re-election in 2021 for a second term in office. Sala announced that he would present his electoral program and the lists of his coalition before the end of January, ruling out a possible alliance with the Five Star Movement (M5S). Sala also sought a reconciliation with Green Europe after the rupture following the cutting of the trees in the Bassini Park to make way for a new department of chemistry for the Politecnico di Milano. Spokeswoman Elena Grandi initially announced an autonomous candidacy with its own candidate for mayor, but ultimately they had a meeting with the outgoing mayor to discuss their support for his candidacy.

On 12 March 2021 Sala joined the European Green Party.

Parties and candidates
This is a partial list of the major parties (and their respective leaders) which will participate in the election.

Opinion polls

Candidates

First round

Second round
Sala vs. Bernardo

Parties

Results
Incumbent mayor Beppe Sala, supported by a centre-left coalition, was re-elected in the first round with about 58% of the vote. His main opponent, centre-right candidate Luca Bernardo, got 31% of the votes. The voter turnout was 47.7%, almost 7 percentage points less than in the latest municipal election.

Results in municipi

Presidents and Councils

Following the 2021 election, all the nine municipi were gained by the centre-left coalition.

Table below shows the results for each municipio with the percentage for each candidate and president elected:

Source: Municipality of Milan - Electoral Service

Table below shows the seats for each coalition in every Municipal Council:

Source: Municipality of Milan - Electoral Service

See also
 2021 Italian local elections

References

2021 elections in Italy
Milan
Milan
Elections in Milan
2020s in Milan
October 2021 events in Italy
Elections postponed due to the COVID-19 pandemic